HMS Magic was an  which served with the Royal Navy during the First World War. The M class were an improvement on the previous , capable of higher speed. Originally laid down as HMS Marigold by J. Samuel White at East Cowes on the Isle of Wight, the vessel was renamed before being launched in 1915. The ship served during the War as part of the Grand Fleet, mainly on anti-submarine and convoy escort duties from the port of Queenstown. In 1917, the destroyer took part in the Battle of Jutland and was one of a small number of British vessels that attacked the German fleet with torpedoes, although both torpedoes missed. In 1918, the ship struck a mine of the coast of Ireland and, although the damage was repaired, 25 people died. After the War, the destroyer was placed in reserve and decommissioned, being sold to be broken up in 1921.

Design and development
Magic was one of sixteen  destroyers ordered by the British Admiralty in September 1914 as part of the First War Construction Programme. The M class was an improved version of the earlier  destroyers, required to reach a higher speed in order to counter rumoured German fast destroyers. It transpired that the German ships did not exist.

Three funnels were fitted.

Armament consisted of three single QF  Mk IV guns on the ship's centreline, with one on the forecastle, one aft on a raised platform and one between the middle and aft funnels on a bandstand. Torpedo armament consisted of two twin mounts for  torpedoes. A single QF 2-pounder  "pom-pom" anti-aircraft gun was mounted between the torpedo tubes. After February 1916, for anti-submarine warfare, Magic was equipped with two chutes for depth charges and a paravane. The number of depth charges carried increased as the war progressed. The ship had a complement of 80 officers and ratings.

Construction and career
Marigold was laid down by J. Samuel White at East Cowes on the Isle of Wight on 1 January 1915 with the yard number 1455, and launched on 10 September. The ship was completed on 8 January 1916 and joined the Grand Fleet. By this time, the ship's name had already been changed to Magic.

The vessel was initially deployed as part of the Grand Fleet, joining the Eleventh Destroyer Flotilla. On 30 May, the destroyer hsailed with the Grand Fleet to confront the German High Seas Fleet in what would be the Battle of Jutland. Magic was one of fourteen M-class destroyers that were allocated to form part of the screen to protect the battleships of the Fleet. Both missed.

In February 1917, increasing U-boat activity threatened shipping sailing south of Ireland to Britain. On 16 February, it was proposed that the flotilla move to Milford Haven in response to threats in the Bristol Channel, but the need did not transpire and so they remained at Queenstown. Another move to the Channel was attempted on 1 March, this time only with Magic and Narwhal, but again, the destroyers soon returned to Queenstown. The destroyer then escorted convoys across the Irish Sea, including one of four merchant ships that was redirected from Liverpool to Milford Haven on 28 March due to mines. On the following day, the vessel picked up the survivors from liner Abosso which had been sunk by the German submarine , subsequently picking up survivors from the schooner Ehrglis and tanker Hektoria over the next week.

After the Armistice of 11 November 1918 that ended the war, the Royal Navy returned to a peacetime level of strength and both the number of ships and the amount of personnel was culled to save money. Magic was initially placed in reserve at Devonport. On 22 September 1921, the vessel was sold and broken up for scrap.

Pennant numbers

References

Citations

Bibliography

 
 
  
 
 
 
 
 
 

 
 
 
 

1915 ships
Admiralty M-class destroyers
Ships built on the Isle of Wight
World War I destroyers of the United Kingdom